Fernando "Fer" Niño Rodríguez (born 24 October 2000) is a Spanish professional footballer who plays as a forward for Villarreal CF B.

Club career
Niño was born in Rota, Andalusia, and joined Villarreal CF's academy in 2016 from Balón de Cádiz CF in his native region. He made his senior debut with the former's C team on 24 August 2019, starting in a 3–0 Tercera División away win against CF Recambios Colón.

Niño scored his first league goal on 26 October 2019, opening the 5–0 home rout of UD Benigànim. The following 22 January, when he still had not even appeared for the reserves, he made his first-team debut by coming on as a second-half substitute for Pau Torres in a 3–0 away victory over Girona FC in the round of 32 of the Copa del Rey.

Niño played his first La Liga match on 25 January 2020, in a 2–1 win at Deportivo Alavés; replacing Carlos Bacca in the 88th minute, he scored the winner the following minute. On 12 November, he renewed his contract until 2024. He contributed five appearances to their victorious campaign in the UEFA Europa League, netting against Maccabi Tel Aviv FC (group phase, 4–0) and FC Red Bull Salzburg (round of 32, 2–0).

In a pre-season friendly against Leicester City in August 2021, Niño broke Wesley Fofana's leg with a late challenge, apologising for the action the following day on social media. Later that month, he was loaned to RCD Mallorca for the season.

International career
Niño made his debut for the Spain under-21 side on 31 May 2021, in a 2–1 extra time defeat of Croatia in the quarter-finals of the 2021 UEFA European Championship. His first goals came on 3 September, when he scored a brace in the 4–1 win over Russia for the 2023 European Championship qualifiers; his Villarreal teammate Yéremi Pino added the other two.

Personal life
Niño's father, also named Fernando, was also a footballer. A central defender, he spent most of his career with Mallorca.

Career statistics

Club

Honours
Villarreal
UEFA Europa League: 2020–21

References

External links

2000 births
Living people
People from Rota, Andalusia
Sportspeople from the Province of Cádiz
Spanish footballers
Footballers from Andalusia
Association football forwards
La Liga players
Segunda División players
Segunda División B players
Tercera División players
Villarreal CF C players
Villarreal CF B players
Villarreal CF players
RCD Mallorca players
UEFA Europa League winning players
Spain under-21 international footballers